Galleh Dari Hajj Morady (also Romanized as Galleh Dārī Ḩājj Morādy) is a village in Sefidar Rural District, Khafr District, Jahrom County, Fars Province, Iran. At the 2006 census, its population was 20, in 5 families.

References 

Populated places in Jahrom County